Kobyla, Kobylá or Kobila means mare in several Slavic languages and may refer to the following places
Croatia
Kobila peak north of Prevlaka

Czech Republic
Kobylá nad Vidnavkou, a village and municipality in Jeseník District, Olomouc Region

Poland
Białebłoto-Kobyla, a village in Gmina Brańszczyk, Wyszków County, Masovian Voivodeship
Kobyla, Podlaskie Voivodeship, a village in Gmina Perlejewo, Siemiatycze County, Podlaskie Voivodeship
Kobyla, Silesian Voivodeship, a village in Gmina Kornowac, Racibórz County, Silesian Voivodeship
Kobyla Głowa (disambiguation) – multiple places
Gmina Kobyla Góra, an administrative district in Ostrzeszów County, Greater Poland Voivodeship
Kobyla Góra, Greater Poland Voivodeship, a village in Ostrzeszów County, Greater Poland Voivodeship
Kobyla Głowa, Lower Silesian Voivodeship, a village in Gmina Ciepłowody, Ząbkowice Śląskie County, Lower Silesian Voivodeship
Kobyla Góra, Opole Voivodeship, a village in Gmina Gorzów Śląski
Kobyla Łąka, Kuyavian-Pomeranian Voivodeship, a village in Gmina Lubień Kujawski
Kobyla Łąka, Masovian Voivodeship, a village in Gmina Bieżuń
Kobyla Łąka-Kolonia, a village in Gmina Bieżuń, Żuromin County, Masovian Voivodeship
Kobyla Kępa, a village in Gmina Sztutowo, Nowy Dwór Gdański County, Pomeranian Voivodeship
Kobyla Miejska, a village in Gmina Szadek, Zduńska Wola County, Łódź Voivodeship
Kobyla Wola, a village in Gmina Górzno, Garwolin County, Masovian Voivodeship
Wólka Kobyla, a village in Gmina Skórzec, Siedlce County, Masovian Voivodeship

Russia
Kobyla-Vis, a river 

Serbia
Besna Kobila, a mountain 

Slovakia 
Devínska Kobyla, a mountain 

Ukraine
Kobila (mountain)

See also
Andrei Kobyla, 14th century Russian noble
Kobylin